Mary Elizabeth Vroman (c. 1924 – April 29, 1967) was an American author of several books and short stories, including "See How They Run", a short story published in 1951.

Background 
Vroman was born circa 1924 in Buffalo, New York, and was raised in the British West Indies. She attended Alabama State Teachers College and graduated in 1949. She was a schoolteacher in Alabama and wrote her first short story, "See How They Run", based on her experiences in the classroom. It was published in Ladies' Home Journal in June 1951. She was presented the 1952 Christopher Award for the work and it was made into a 1953 film entitled Bright Road. Her work on the film earned her admittance to the Screen Writers Guild. She was their first African-American woman member.

An author, her stories and screenplays depict the challenges of poverty and disadvantage. She was married to Dr. Oliver M. Harper at the time of her death after surgery on April 29, 1967, in New York.

Works 
 See How They Run
 And Have Not Charity (1951)
 Bright Road
 Esther (1963)
 Shaped to Its Purpose: Delta Sigma Theta, The First Fifty Years
 Harlem Summer

References

External links 
"Mary Elizabeth Vroman (1924–1967)", IMDb.

1920s births
1967 deaths
African-American schoolteachers
Schoolteachers from Alabama
20th-century American women educators
20th-century American writers
20th-century American women writers
20th-century American educators
20th-century African-American women writers
20th-century African-American writers